Edwin Edwards (5 April 1862 – 31 May 1909) was a New Zealand businessman, local politician, newspaper proprietor and editor, balladeer. He was born in Camberwell, Surrey, England on 5 April 1862. He unsuccessfully contested the  electorate in the  against Alfred Cadman.

References

1862 births
1909 deaths
New Zealand businesspeople
New Zealand writers
People from Camberwell
Unsuccessful candidates in the 1896 New Zealand general election
British emigrants to New Zealand
19th-century New Zealand politicians